Fernando González (born 26 August 1950) is an Ecuadorian former swimmer. He competed in three events at the 1968 Summer Olympics.

References

1950 births
Living people
Ecuadorian male swimmers
Olympic swimmers of Ecuador
Swimmers at the 1968 Summer Olympics
Sportspeople from Guayaquil